Scratches in the Table is a 1998 Dutch film directed by Ineke Houtman. It was the Netherlands' official Best Foreign Language Film submission at the 72nd Academy Awards, but did not manage to receive a nomination.

Cast
Madelief Verelst as Madelief
Giulia Fleury as Madelief als peuter/Madelief as a toddler
Rijk de Gooyer as Opa/Grandpa
Peter Blok as Opa als jonge man/Grandpa as a young Man
Margo Dames as Moeder/Mother
Kitty Courbois as Oma/Grandma
Veerle Dobbelaere as Oma als jonge vrouw/ Grandma as a young woman
Frederik Brom as Mischa (as Freek Brom)
Tjerk Risselada as Vader van Mischa/Mischa's father
Pim Lambeau as Tante Ant/Auntie Ant
Adrian Brine as Man van tante Ant/The husband of Auntie Ant
Ineke Veenhoven as Buurvrouw/The neighbor (woman)
Rob van de Meeberg as Buurman/The neighbor (man)
Jaap Stobbe as Jaap
Ingeborg Elzevier as Vrouw van Jaap/wife of Jaap

References

External links

Dutch drama films
1990s Dutch-language films
Films based on children's books
1998 films